Abhimaan may refer to:

Abhimaan (1957 film), a Bollywood film of 1957
Abhimaan (1973 film), a Bollywood film starring Amitabh Bachchan
Abhimaan (1977 film), starring Sadhu Meher
Abhimaan (1986 film), starring Kajal Gupta
 Abhimaan (2016 film), a Bengali romantic action drama
Abhimaan (TV series)